Ken Brand is a Canadian playwright from Winnipeg, Manitoba. One of the significant figures in the emergence of LGBT theatre in Canada in the 1990s, he is most noted for his play The Bathhouse Suite, which appears in the Sky Gilbert-edited anthology Perfectly Abnormal: Seven Gay Plays alongside plays by Harry Rintoul, Shawn Postoff, Christian Lloyd, Greg MacArthur, Greg Kearney and Michael Achtman.

His other plays included Benchmarks and Burying Michael.

References

20th-century Canadian dramatists and playwrights
21st-century Canadian dramatists and playwrights
Canadian male dramatists and playwrights
Canadian gay writers
Canadian LGBT dramatists and playwrights
Writers from Winnipeg
Living people
Year of birth missing (living people)
Gay dramatists and playwrights
21st-century Canadian LGBT people
20th-century Canadian LGBT people